Lundergan is a surname. Notable people with the surname include:

Alison Lundergan Grimes (born 1978), née Alison Lundergan, American lawyer and politician
Jerry Lundergan (born 1946/1947), American businessman and politician, father of Alison